James Keith "Jimmy" Marshall (April 17, 1839 – July 3, 1863) was a Confederate Army officer during the American Civil War. Marshall commanded the wounded J. Johnston Pettigrew's brigade during Pickett's Charge at the Battle of Gettysburg and died during the assault.

Early life
Marshall was born in Fauquier County, Virginia, to Edward Carrington Marshall and Rebecca Courtenay Peyton Marshall. He was a grandson of Chief Justice of the United States John Marshall. He was related through blood or marriage to Thomas Jefferson, George E. Pickett, and Robert E. Lee. His great-grandfather had attended school with George Washington and was commander of the 3rd Virginia Infantry during the American Revolutionary War. He was also a first cousin of Col. Thomas A. Marshall and  second cousin of General Lee's aide, Col. Charles Marshall.

James K. Marshall graduated from the Virginia Military Institute in 1860.  The Society of Cadets chose him as the final orator for graduation ceremonies. He also served as first lieutenant of a cadet company. When Virginia seceded from the Union, Marshall was teaching school in Edenton, North Carolina.

Civil War
Marshall accepted a commission as captain of Company M of the 1st North Carolina "Bethel Regiment" under Col. Daniel Harvey Hill in the spring of 1861. He did not take part in the Battle of Big Bethel. He received a promotion to colonel of the 52nd North Carolina on April 23, 1862 under the command of Brig. Gen J. Johnston Pettigrew, despite having no combat experience. Marshall was initially elected to the post of lieutenant colonel and Zebulon Vance was elected colonel, however, Vance declined the position so Marshall took the spot instead. Marshall defended Norfolk, Virginia from federal gunboats, then defended the Blackwater River. Pettigrew's Brigade joined the Army of Northern Virginia in late May 1863, for the Gettysburg Campaign.

Gettysburg
Pettigrew's Brigade saw intense fighting during the Battle of Gettysburg. On July 1, 1863, Marshall's regiment initially encountered two companies from the 80th New York Infantry at the Harmon farm.  After dispersing these men, a portion of the 52nd North Carolina fought part of the 8th New York Cavalry at Meal's Orchard. The 52nd crossed Willoughby Run and faced resistance from more cavalry units around Fairfield Road. After crossing Fairfield Road, Marshall's men slammed into the flank of the 121st Pennsylvania of Lt. Col. Alexander Biddle, routing them from the field and sending them running toward Seminary Ridge. Marshall's men next attacked the 80th New York of Col. Theodore Gates and forced them to retreat. Soon after this attack, Maj. Gen. Henry Heth was wounded and Pettigrew was elevated to divisional command. Due to the high casualty rate in Pettigrew's Brigade command structure, Marshall was given charge of it. The brigade suffered 1,100 casualties out of 2,584 engaged, however Marshall's 52nd North Carolina suffered only 26 casualties.

The brigade was not involved in any fighting on July 2, 1863. Marshall had the brigade's Moravian band perform to heighten their morale after the first day's carnage.

Leading the decimated brigade during Pickett's Charge, Marshall's men crossed the field around the Bliss Farm and Stevens' Run and then crossed the Emmitsburg Rd, coming under withering fire at the fence line. While crossing the Emmitsburg Road, Marshall turned to Capt. Stockton Heth (son of Maj. Gen. Henry Heth) and said "We do not know which of us will be next to fall." Just minutes later, as Marshall neared the stonewall on Cemetery Ridge he was struck in the forehead and killed instantly by two bullets while encouraging his men.

Aftermath
Marshall's family did not officially know of his death until several months later, when they received a letter from Marshall's cousin F. Lewis Marshall informing them that James K. Marshall died at Gettysburg. They had heard conflicting reports, and hoped that he was a prisoner of war.

Marshall's remains were buried on the field at Gettysburg. It is assumed, but not known for sure, that he was re-interred at Hollywood Cemetery in Richmond, Virginia.

Notes

References
 Allardice, Bruce S. Confederate Colonels: A Biographical Register. Columbia: University of Missouri Press, 2008. .
 Hess, Earl J. Lee's Tar Heels: The Pettigrew-Kirkland-MacRae Brigade. Chapel Hill: University of North Carolina Press, 2002. .
 Letter from Marshall's cousin F. Lewis Marshall to Marshall's parents informing them of James K. Marshall's death.
 And Then A.P. Hill Came Up-Web biography of Marshall.
 VMI Biography of Marshall.

Further reading
 Pfanz, Harry W. Gettysburg – The First Day. Chapel Hill: University of North Carolina Press, 2001. .

External links
 Find A grave memorial for James Marshall at Hollywood Cemetery Richmond
 Find A grave cenopath memorial for James Marshall

1839 births
1863 deaths
People from Fauquier County, Virginia
Confederate States Army officers
Virginia Military Institute alumni
Confederate States of America military personnel killed in the American Civil War
People of Virginia in the American Civil War
People of North Carolina in the American Civil War
James K.